Phursook Bay is a bay in the Pangong Tso that is said to have formed the border between Ladakh and Tibet's Rutog County during the British Raj. The present day Line of Actual Control between China and India runs near the same location and remains fiercely contested.

Geography 
The Phursook Bay was described by the British surveyor H. H. Godwin-Austen in 1867 in his notes on the Pangong Lake district. Traversing the southern shore of the lake, he arrived at the plain of Thakung, where the Chushul River joins the lake, found a bay at its southeastern corner, then a low spur abutting on the lake and then another large bay. It is called Phursook and is said to form the boundary between the princely state of Jammu and Kashmir and the district of Rudok. His description continued:

Henry Strachey had traversed the same region earlier in 1847 as a boundary commissioner for Kashmir.
He drew the frontier between Kashmir and Rudok at the same location. After crossing the lake at this location, his frontier line hugged the northern shore of the lake and ran east until the Khurnak Plain. The narrow channel at the Khurnak Plain was included entirely within Tibet. (Maps 1 and 2)

Historical maps

Notes

References

Bibliography 
 

Pangong Lake
Borders of Ladakh
Territorial disputes of China
Territorial disputes of India
Rutog County
Bays of China
Bays of India